George Brough (21 April 1890 – 12 January 1970), was a motorcycle racer, world record holding motorcycle and automobile manufacturer, and showman. He was known for his powerful and expensive Brough Superior motorcycles which were the first superbikes. George died in 1970 but his legacy lives on in the many Brough Superior motorcycles maintained by enthusiasts to this day.

Early life
George was the second son of motorcycle pioneer William Edward Brough and was born at 10 Mandalay Street, Basford, Nottingham on 21 April 1890.  William Brough had been building motorcycles at his factory in Nottingham since the 1890s so it was expected that George and his brother would join in the family business.

Business

George wanted to develop his father's business and make high-performance motorcycles. His father was not convinced, however, so George set up his own factory nearby in 1919 at Haydn Road in Nottingham to produce what he called the Brough Superior range of motorcycles and motor cars. The name Superior was suggested by a friend but his father reputedly took it personally. George's motorcycles lived up to the claim, however, and he brought together the best components he could find and added distinctive styling details. He had a flair for marketing and in 1922 rode a Brough Superior SS80 which he called Spit and Polish at Brooklands. managing an unofficial  lap.

3,048 motorcycles of 19 models were made in 21 years of production. Most were custom built to customers' requirements and rarely were any two of the same configuration. Each motorcycle was assembled twice. The first assembly was for fitting of all components, then the motorcycle was disassembled and all parts were painted or plated as needed, then the finished parts were assembled finally. Every motorcycle was test ridden to ensure that it performed to specification, and was certified by George Brough. The SS100 model was ridden at 100 mph or more prior to delivery. If any motorcycle did not meet specification, it returned to the shop for rework until it performed properly.

In 1929 an SS100 was purchased by Sir William Lyons who two years later applied the same name to his own first four-wheeled vehicle, much to Brough's disgruntlement at the time, though the two later became close friends.   "S" and "S" were the first two initials of the Swallow Sidecar Company which Lyons had co-founded back in 1923.

In 1940, World War II brought an end to production as the factory was turned over to produce Rolls-Royce Merlin aero-engines. After hostilities had ceased there were no suitable engines available so the company was wound up.

Racing career
In 1928, George Brough recorded  at Arpajon, unofficially the world's fastest speed on a solo motorcycle.

Brough was noted for riding wearing a flat-cap which he had specially made to his requirements.

References

Further reading
 Clark, Ronald H. (1964) Brough Superior, The Rolls Royce of Motor Cycles

People from Basford, Nottinghamshire
Sportspeople from Nottinghamshire
English motorcycle racers
British motorcycle designers
British automotive engineers
1890 births
1970 deaths
British motorcycle pioneers